Creole Cookin', is an album by cornetist Bobby Hackett which was released on the Verve label in 1967.

Critical reception

Scott Yanow of AllMusic called it "one of his finest all-around recordings" and states: "The cornetist is featured on 11 Dixieland standards and joined by a 15-piece all-star band arranged by Bob Wilber; Wilber and tenor great Zoot Sims also receive some solo space on this essential release".

Track listing
 "High Society" (Porter Steele) – 2:07
 "Tin Roof Blues" (George Brunies, Paul Mares, Ben Pollack, Leon Roppolo, Mel Stitzel) – 4:43
 "When the Saints Go Marching In" (Traditional) – 2:52
 "Basin Street Blues" (Spencer Williams) – 3:51
 "Fidgety Feet" (Nick LaRocca, Larry Shields) – 2:19
 "Royal Garden Blues" (Clarence Williams, Spencer Williams) – 2:49
 "Muskrat Ramble" (Kid Ory, Ray Gilbert) – 2:32
 "Original Dixieland One Step" (LaRocca) – 2:12
 "New Orleans" (Hoagy Carmichael) – 3:01
 "Lazy Mood" (Eddie Miller, Johnny Mercer) – 2:03
 "Do You Know What It Means to Miss New Orleans" (Eddie DeLange, Louis Alter) – 3:03

Personnel
Bobby Hackett – cornet
Rusty Dedrick, Jimmy Maxwell – trumpet
Bob Brookmeyer – trombone, valve trombone
Cutty Cutshall (tracks 1-5, 7-9 & 11), Lou McGarity (tracks 6 & 10) – trombone
Bob Wilber – clarinet, alto saxophone, arranger
Jerry Dodgion – alto saxophone
Joe Farrell (tracks 4, 5, 9 & 11), Zoot Sims – tenor saxophone
Pepper Adams – baritone saxophone
Dave McKenna – piano
Wayne Wright – guitar
Buddy Jones – bass
Morey Feld – drums

References

1967 albums
Verve Records albums